Areeba Habib is a Pakistani model and television actress. Habib made her television debut with negative role of Nishaal in 2018 series Koi Chand Rakh. She further played the role of Chand in Qadam Qadam Ishq, Taniya in Janbaaz and Misha in Jalan.

Career 
Habib was introduced to the Pakistani fashion industry by model Frieha Altaf. She has appeared in several TV commercials for international and local brands and ramp the walk for several designers. In 2018 she made her acting debut with Koi Chand Rakh opposite Ayeza Khan and Imran Abbas and since then appeared in leading roles in several television shows including Qadam Qadam Ishq opposite Azfar Rehman, Janbaaz opposite Danish Taimoor and Jalan opposite Emmad Irfani. Now she's working on a new tv play Rukhsati alongside Azfar Rehman. She started her YouTube channel in 2019.

Television

References

External links 

Pakistani female models
Pakistani television actresses
Pakistani film actresses
Living people
1993 births